Micro-Phonies is the sixth full-length studio album by British electronic band Cabaret Voltaire. Released 29 October 1984, the album was the group's most mainstream release to date, with the singles "Sensoria" and "James Brown" gaining popularity, especially the former, due to the music video finding MTV airplay. The album sees Cabaret Voltaire continuing to change, pursuing the more electro and synthpop-oriented direction they had started shifting towards on The Crackdown.

Track listing

Personnel
 Richard H. Kirk - synthesizers, programming, guitars
 Stephen Mallinder - vocals, bass
 Roger Quail - drums
 Mark Tattersall - percussion
 Eric Random - tablas

Video 
The video for "Sensoria" was directed by Peter Care, and attracted airplay on MTV. It was voted Best Video of the Year by the Los Angeles Times in 1985, and was later procured by the New York Museum of Modern Art.

Poster 
A poster for the album is visible on Ferris Bueller's wall in the 1986 film Ferris Bueller's Day Off.

References 

1984 albums
Cabaret Voltaire (band) albums
Albums produced by Flood (producer)
Some Bizzare Records albums
Virgin Records albums